Qin Hui is the name of:

Qin Hui (1090–1155), Prime Minister of the Southern Song Dynasty
Qin Hui (historian) (born 1953), professor of history in Tsinghua University

See also
 King Hui of Qin
 Duke Hui of Qin (disambiguation)